Pablo Soto may refer to:

 Pablo Soto (software developer) (born 1979), Spanish software developer and local councilor
 Pablo Soto (footballer) (born 1995), Chilean football goalkeeper
  (born 1995), Chilean football forward for Deportes Puerto Montt